Nazar Najarian (circa 24 July 1957 – 4 August 2020), also known as Nazo, was a Lebanese businessman and politician of Armenian descent who served as secretary-general of Lebanon's Kataeb Party, a Christian political party, from 11 June 2018 until his death on 4 August 2020.

Biography
Najarian was the eldest sibling in an Armenian family of five. He got involved in Lebanese politics at the onset of the Lebanese Civil War in 1975. 

In 1980, Bachir Gemayel had commissioned Nazar with the mission of "mobilizing individuals". He also undertook several missions during the Bachir Gemayel era, and especially during the Lebanese Civil War.

He had moved away from Lebanon to Qatar and stayed there until October 2012, after which he went to Montreal, where he was completely away from politics. He was CEO at Tetran Holding Inc.

Najarian was killed on 4 August 2020, aged 63, after a series of explosions had occurred at the Port of Beirut, sending debris across the city. He suffered head trauma and succumbed to his injuries. He was buried on 8 August 2020.

References 

1957 deaths
2020 deaths
Kataeb Party politicians
Lebanese Christians
Haigazian University alumni
Lebanese people of Armenian descent
2020 Beirut explosion
Accidental deaths in Lebanon
Deaths by explosive device
Deaths from head injury
People of the Lebanese Civil War